Interbrasil STAR S/A was a Brazilian airline founded in 1994 as a feeder airline to Transbrasil. It ceased activities along with its parent company in 2001.

History
Interbrasil Sistema de Transporte Aéreo Regional was  founded on January 14, 1994 as a subsidiary of Transbrasil with the purpose to serve as a feeder carrier. Operations started on July 3, 1995.

In 1999 Interbrasil STAR participated with Total Linhas Aéreas in the creation of a shuttle service between Rio de Janeiro-Santos Dumont and Belo Horizonte-Pampulha using mostly the ATR-42 of Total.

On December 4, 2001, following the collapse of its parent company, Interbrasil STAR ceased operations.

Destinations
Interbrasil STAR served the following cities:

Fleet

Airline affinity program
Interbrasil STAR, being fully integrated into Transbrasil network accrued miles on Transbrasil’s Frequent-flyer program TransPass. Points could be used on Transbrasil and Interbrasil STAR services. Points held at the time of the airline's collapse lost their value as no other airline took over the program.

See also

List of defunct airlines of Brazil

References

External links
Interbrasil STAR Photo Archive at airliners.net

Defunct airlines of Brazil
Airlines established in 1994
Airlines disestablished in 2001
Transbrasil
1994 establishments in Brazil